The 1970 New Zealand Grand Prix was a race held at the Pukekohe Park Raceway on 10 January 1970.  The race had 20 starters.

It was the 16th New Zealand Grand Prix, and doubled as the second round of the 1970 Tasman Series.  Frank Matich won his first NZGP in his McLaren Formula 5000 ahead of British racer Derek Bell driving a Tasman Formula specification Brabham-Cosworth. The first New Zealand driver to finish was Graeme Lawrence in the 1969 Chris Amon Dino.

Classification 
Results as follows:

References

Grand Prix
New Zealand Grand Prix
Tasman Series
January 1970 sports events in New Zealand